Ali Al-Khajah (Arabic: علي الخاجة) (born 20 March 1993) is an Emirati footballer who plays as a midfielder.

External links

References

1993 births
Living people
Emirati footballers
Association football midfielders
Al Ahli Club (Dubai) players
Hatta Club players
Dibba Al-Hisn Sports Club players
Al Hamriyah Club players
UAE Pro League players
UAE First Division League players